Joan Osborne is a former international lawn and indoor bowls competitor for Wales.

Bowls career

World Championships
In 1977 she won the gold medal in the triples, a bronze medal in the fours with Enid Morgan, Margaret Pomeroy and Janet Ackland and a silver medal in the team event (Taylor Trophy), at the 1977 World Outdoor Bowls Championship in Worthing.

National
Osborne has won three Welsh National Bowls Championships; the pairs in 1969 and the triples in 1972 and 1987.

References

Date of birth missing (living people)
Welsh female bowls players
Bowls World Champions
Year of birth missing (living people)
Living people